The Women's Basketball Invitational (WBI) is a women's college basketball tournament created in 2009 by Sport Tours.  The inaugural tournament occurred at the conclusion of the 2009–10 NCAA Division I women's basketball season. Selections for the WBI are announced on Selection Monday.  Prior to the 2020 COVID-19 pandemic the field for the WBI consisted of a 16-team, single elimination divided into two regions with 8 seeded teams in each.  The current format consists of 8 teams, all of which are guraranteed 3 games.  Teams are picked based on NET, record, conference standings, end of year performance, and quality wins and losses, after the NCAA and WNIT fields are filled.

Teams in the WBI traditionally competed on the home court of the higher seed; recent tournaments have been held at the Clive M. Beck Center in Lexington, Kentucky. Teams not making the NCAA Division I women's basketball tournament or Women's National Invitation Tournament (WNIT) are eligible for the WBI.

Although the WBI shares a similar name with the College Basketball Invitational (CBI) and fills a similar role (a postseason tournament outside the auspices of the NCAA and NIT tournaments), the two competitions are operated by separate organizations and are unrelated except for the coincidental name.

Champions

 Through the 2019 edition, games were played at campus sites; the championship game venue is listed. Starting with the 2021 edition, the entire tournament is played at a single site.

See also 
 NCAA Division I women's basketball tournament
 Women's National Invitation Tournament
 National Women's Invitational Tournament
 NCAA Division II women's basketball tournament
 NCAA Division III women's basketball tournament
 NAIA Women's Basketball Championships

References

External links
 

Postseason college basketball competitions in the United States
 
Recurring sporting events established in 2010
College women's basketball competitions in the United States